The following is a timeline of the Syrian civil war for 2023. Information about aggregated casualty counts is found in Casualties of the Syrian civil war.

As of 2023, active fighting in the conflict between the Syrian government and rebel groups had mostly subsided, but there were occasional flareups in Northwestern Syria.   In early 2023, reports indicated that the forces of ISIS in Syria had mostly been defeated, with only a few cells remaining in various remote locations.

January

On 2 January, as part of Israel's continuing strikes against Syrian and Iranian targets, Israeli warplanes conducted several airstrikes on the Damascus International airport, killing 2 Syrian soldiers and temporarily putting the airport out of service.

On 4 January, 5 Manbij Military Council fighters were killed and another was injured by a remnant ISIS landmine whilst driving on a road near the village of Al-Said Ibrahim in the Manbij countryside.

On the same day, an Islamic State fighter was killed in clashes with SDF operatives in the village of Al-Zir, north of Mayadin.

On 7 January, 2 Pro-Assad fighters were killed in 2 separate attacks conducted by ISIS cells in the al-Rasafah and Palmyra deserts.

On 9 January, casualties were inflicted on a Pro-Assad militia near the town of Al-Jalaa in the Deir-ez-Zor countryside, after ISIS militants attacked Syrian military positions in the area. One ISIS militant was killed in the clashes.

On 10 January, joint forces of the US-led coalition and forces of the SDF launched a counter-terror operation in the village of Al-Sabaa wa Arbain where 2 ISIS fighters had barricaded themselves inside a house. One ISIS militant killed himself by detonating a suicide vest and the other was shot dead by the joint forces.

Between 10 and 11 January, as part of the ongoing clashes on the Idlib frontline 12 Syrian soldiers and 3 HTS militants were killed in violent clashes.

On 20 January, Syrian Army forces killed 3 ISIS militants including local ISIS leader, Muhammad Ali al-Shaghouri, in a security operation in the town of Muzayrib, Daraa.

On 22 January, at least 16 civilians were killed after a damaged house collapsed in the city of Aleppo.

On 23 January, forces of the Syrian Army's 17th Division found the bodies of 9 dead militiamen of the Afghan Liwa Fatemiyoun militia, that fights for the Syrian government, in the desert near Al-Masrab. The patrol went missing in the area on 18th January. The militiamen had been stripped and slaughtered on the spot, likely by ISIS cells.

On the same day, 3 Syrian soldiers were killed after ISIS operatives, under the cover of fog, attacked a Syrian Army outpost near the Taqba Airbase.

On 25 January, 3 SDF fighters were killed after two ISIS operatives opened fire on an SDF checkpoint in the village of al-Hawaij in the Deir ez-Zor countryside.

On 30 January just after midnight, at least 10 people were killed in several airstrikes conducted by unidentified drones in the town of Abu Kamal near the Syria-Iraq border. Reports suggest trucks filled with Iranian weapons were the target of the attack.

February

On 2 February, Turkish defence minister, Hulusi Akar announced the defence ministries of Turkey, Syrian and Russia will hold a meeting in Moscow to try and agree to a rapprochement and normalisation of relations between Syria and Turkey.

On 6 February, a magnitude 9 strike-slip earthquake took place along the East Anatolian Fault on the border of Turkey and Syria. The earthquake left tens of thousands dead and many more injured.

On 7 February, at least 20 ISIS fighters escaped a prison in the town of Raju, in the northern Afrin countryside, near Turkey, after the organisation bribed a prison guard.

On 10 February, 2 ISIS operatives, one of them an Iraqi, were killed in a joint Coalition-SDF raid near the town of Al-Suwar in the Deir ez-Zor countryside.

On the evening of 11 February, at least 75 people were abducted by ISIS in the Palmyra desert in the western Homs countryside. At least 12 of the abductees were executed including a Syrian soldier.

On 17 February, at least 68 people, including 7 Syrian soldiers , were killed in an ISIS attack on a large group of truffle farmers in the desert near Al-Sukhnah.

On 19 February, just after midnight, 15 people were killed in an Israeli airstrike in Damascus.

Later that day, 6 SNA fighters were killed in an ambush by ISIS operatives in the Tuwainan area of the Raqqa countryside.

On 24 February, a senior Iraqi militant of Hurras al-Din and another individual were killed in a Coalition airstrike in the village of Mashhad Ruhin in Idlib.

On 27 February, 10 civilians were killed and 12 others were injured by possible remnant ISIS landmines east of Salamiyah.

March

On 2 March, 8 civilians were killed and 35 were wounded after a civilian farming truck drove over a suspected ISIS landmine near Kobajjep in the Syrian desert.

On 4 March, in the southern Raqqa countryside, a Shepard was killed and 1,000 sheep were stolen after an ISIS attack.

At midnight on 8 March, 3 people were killed after Israeli warplanes bombed and temporarily shut down Aleppo's airport.

On the same day, at least 7 people were killed in a suspected Israeli drone strike on an alleged weapon factory in Deir ez-Zor city.

On 9 March, amid ongoing insurgent attack in Daraa Governorate, a Syrian Army patrol was ambushed on the Daraa-Damascus highway in southern Syria. 3 Syrian soldiers and an insurgent were killed in the ambush.

On 11 March, ISIS militants attacked a group of truffle farmers in the Khanaser desert south of Aleppo. 3 farmers were executed on the spot by the ISIS attackers whilst another 26 others were abducted.

On 15 March, the war entered its twelfth year. The anniversary was marked by protests in rebel-held areas like Idlib, where protesters vowed to 'continue the revolution against the al-Assad regime.'

On 17 March, 9 'anti-terror' SDF fighters were killed in a double helicopter crash in the Duhok Governorate of Iraq.

On 19 March, Israeli operatives assassinated 31-year-old Ali Ramzi al-Aswad a Palestinian Islamic Jihad member in Damascus.

References 

2023 timelines